The 1986–87 Eastern Counties Football League season was the 45th in the history of Eastern Counties Football League a football competition in England.

League table

The league featured 22 clubs which competed in the league last season, along with one new club:
Watton United, joined from the Anglian Combination

League table

References

External links
 Eastern Counties Football League

1986-87
1986–87 in English football leagues